The third season of Ellen, an American television series, began September 13, 1995 and ended on May 21, 1996. It aired on ABC. The region 1 DVD was released on February 28, 2006. This season also contains two episodes that were meant to be a part of season one, "The Tape" and "The Mugging".

Cast

Main cast
 Ellen DeGeneres as Ellen Morgan
 Joely Fisher as Paige Clark
 Arye Gross as Adam Green (Episodes 1–5)
 David Anthony Higgins as Joe Farrell
 Clea Lewis as Audrey Penney
 Jeremy Piven as Spence Kovak

Episodes

References

1995 American television seasons
1996 American television seasons
Ellen (TV series) seasons